Eudorylas longifrons is a species of fly in the family Pipunculidae.

Distribution
Belgium, Great Britain, Czech Republic, Denmark, Germany, Hungary, Latvia, Slovakia, Switzerland.

References

Pipunculidae
Insects described in 1966
Diptera of Europe